Paraphosphorus hololeucus is a species of beetle in the family Cerambycidae. It was described by Linell in 1896. It is known from Kenya.

References

Tragocephalini
Beetles described in 1896